Menagerie Carousel, also known as the Burlington Carousel, is a historic carousel located at Burlington, Alamance County, North Carolina. It was built in 1913, and is a hand-carved, wooden carousel manufactured by the Dentzel Carousel Company of Philadelphia, Pennsylvania.  The carousel features 46 animals include one lion, one tiger, one giraffe, one reindeer, four pigs, four rabbits, four ostriches, four cats and 26 horses. The carousel also has two chariots. Housing the carousel is a permanent shelter built in the summer of 1948.

It was added to the National Register of Historic Places in 1982.

References

Buildings and structures on the National Register of Historic Places in North Carolina
Carousels on the National Register of Historic Places
Amusement rides introduced in 1913
Buildings and structures in Alamance County, North Carolina
National Register of Historic Places in Alamance County, North Carolina
1913 establishments in North Carolina